Ajisen Ramen is a Japan-based chain of fast food restaurants selling Japanese ramen noodle soup dishes. The company's logo, featuring artwork of a little girl named Chii-chan, can be found on their stores and products. Outside of Japan, Ajisen Ramen has outlets in Australia, Cambodia, Canada, China, Egypt, Hong Kong, Indonesia, Malaysia, the Marianas, Mongolia, the Philippines, Singapore, South Korea, Thailand, the United States, Vietnam, Morocco and Panama. There are over 700 Ajisen Ramen restaurants.

History

 1968 – Pork bone white soup based Tonkotsu ramen from Kurume, Fukuoka was modified with garlic flavour by a Hakka person from Meinong, Taiwan in Kumamoto, Japan. He is the founder Takaharu Shigemitsu ( Shigemitsu Takaharu), or original name Liu Tan Hsiang.
 1972 – Shigemitsu Industry Co., Ltd. was incorporated and a noodle and soup factory was established. Franchising was started by the company.
 1994 – The first oversea joint venture business was started at Taipei, Taiwan. It ended three years later without success.
 1996 – With the death of Takaharu Shigemitsu, his son Katsuaki Shigemitsu took over  the business. Poon Wai opened the first store in Hong Kong under license of Ajisen Ramen.
 2007 – Ajisen Ramen (China) Ltd. was listed on the Hong Kong Stock Exchange.

Locations

Japan
 Hokkaido
 Tohoku - Aomori Prefecture
 Kanto - Ibaraki Prefecture
 Chubu - Shizuoka Prefecture, Nagano Prefecture, Nagoya, Gifu Prefecture
 Kansai - Osaka Prefecture, Wakayama Prefecture
 Chugoku-Shikoku - Hiroshima Prefecture, Kochi Prefecture, Ehime Prefecture
 Kyushu - Fukuoka Prefecture, Saga Prefecture, Nagasaki Prefecture, Oita Prefecture, Miyazaki Prefecture
 Kumamoto Prefecture - about 70 stores
 Okinawa Prefecture

Hong Kong
There are several locations in Hong Kong, with one of them being at the Hong Kong International Airport.

China

Since its inception, Ajisen Ramen has made significant headway into the Chinese market, especially in the metropolis of Shanghai, where it has 132 locations. There are a total of 590 Ajisen restaurants in the China region as of August 2011. Those expansion of stores were started by present CEO of Ajisen Ramen (China) Ltd., Poon Wai (潘慰) from Hong Kong in 1996.

The current president of the Hong Kong-listed Ajisen China Holdings is businesswoman Poon Wai. The company's executive directors were Poon Wai, her brother Jason Poon Ka Man (潘嘉聞), and Yin Yi Bing (尹一兵). Yan resigned on 18 July 2013.

In 2011 the Chinese company was fined 200,000 yuan for misrepresenting the nutritional content of its soup.

Canada
There are six locations in the Greater Toronto Area:
 Ajisen Ramen - two in Markham, Ontario
 Ajisen Ramen - three in Toronto (Downtown, North York, Scarborough)
 Ajisen Ramen - Vaughan, Ontario

One in Windsor, Ontario

United States
There are numbers of locations in  Los Angeles, New York City, San Francisco, and the first Ajisen Ramen restaurant opened in San Diego in November 2016. 
Corporate manufacturing and distribution headquarters for U.S. operations supplies U.S. stores as well as Guam is located at S. El Monte, Los Angeles, CA.

Panama
Ciudad de Panamá 
 Ajisen Ramen - Via Brasil 
 Ajisen Ramen - El Dorado

Europe
Ajisen Ramen opened a new outlet at Helsinki Airport in Finland in 2019. This is the first location in the Nordic countries and the second in Europe. The restaurant opened in the newest part of the ongoing terminal expansion at the airport in early 2019.
Ajisen Ramen also has an outlet in Rome Fiumicino Airport.

Singapore 
There are currently 14 outlets in Singapore, a few being located at: 
 AMK Hub
Bedok Mall
Compass One
Waterway Point
Vivocity

Malaysia 
5 Stores at Malaysia.

 Two at Johor Bahru.
 One at Aeon Bandaraya Melaka Shopping Centre.
 One at Boulevard Commercial Centre, Miri.
 One at Vivacity Megamall, Kuching.

Philippines
 Robinsons Place Manila
 Sto Domingo, Quezon City
 V.A. Rufino St, Legaspi Village, Makati
 Ortigas Center, Pasig
 Robinsons Place Las Piñas
 Double Dragon Meridian Plaza
 Robinsons Magnolia
 Robinsons Galleria
 Ayala Malls Manila Bay

New Zealand
 Newmarket, Auckland

Hiring controversy 
The company announced the appointment of Joseph Lau Si-sing (劉士盛) as chief operating officer on 18 July 2013. Lau left the company "by mutual consent" in late September, five days after corporate governance  activist David Webb criticised his appointment. Webb pointed out that the company had failed to disclose that Lau, former managing director of McDonald's (Hong Kong), was convicted in April 2009 of bribery and attempting to pervert the course of justice. Later, Webb blogged that Lau did not graduate from Caltech as was claimed in the company's appointment announcement. Lau's prison term expired just three days before Ajisen first announced his appointment. The company said the errors were "mainly caused by insufficient communication between Lau and the staff of our human resources department and translation error".

See also

 Aji Ichiban
 List of noodle restaurants
 Ramen shop

References

External links
 

Ajisen Ramen Japan
Ajisen Ramen Hong Kong
Ajisen Ramen China
Ajisen Ramen Singapore

Companies listed on the Hong Kong Stock Exchange
Food and drink companies of Hong Kong
Hong Kong brands
Catering and food service companies of Hong Kong
Fast-food chains of Japan
Ramen shops